RING finger protein 39 is a protein that in humans is encoded by the RNF39 gene.

This gene lies within the major histocompatibility complex class I region on chromosome 6. Studies of a similar rat protein suggest that this gene encodes a protein that plays a role in an early phase of synaptic plasticity. Alternative splicing results in three transcript variants encoding different isoforms.

References

Further reading

RING finger proteins